Lawrence Winchester Wetherby (January 2, 1908 – March 27, 1994) was an American politician who served as Lieutenant Governor and Governor of Kentucky. He was the first of only two governors in state history born in Jefferson County, despite the fact that Louisville (the county seat) is the state's most populous city. The second governor born in Jefferson County is the incumbent governor, Andy Beshear.

After graduating from the University of Louisville, Wetherby held several minor offices in the Jefferson County judicial system before being elected lieutenant governor in 1947. He was called Kentucky's first "working" lieutenant governor because Governor Earle C. Clements asked him to carry out duties beyond his constitutional responsibility to preside over the state Senate, such as preparing the state budget and attending the Southern Governors Conference. In 1950, Clements resigned to assume a seat in the U.S. Senate, elevating Wetherby to governor. Wetherby won immediate acclaim by calling a special legislative session to increase funding for education and government benefits from the state's budget surplus. In 1951, he won a four-year full term as governor, during which he continued and expanded many of Clements' programs, including increased road construction and industrial diversification. He endorsed the Supreme Court's 1954 desegregation order in the case of Brown v. Board of Education and appointed a biracial commission to oversee the successful integration of the state's schools. As chairman of the Southern Governors Conference in 1954 and 1955, he encouraged other southern governors to accept and implement desegregation.

Limited to one term by the state constitution, Wetherby supported Bert Combs to be his successor, but Combs lost in the Democratic primary to A. B. "Happy" Chandler, a former governor and factional opponent of both Wetherby and Clements. Chandler's failure to support Wetherby's 1956 bid to succeed Democrat Alben Barkley in the Senate contributed to his loss to Republican John Sherman Cooper. From 1964 to 1966, Wetherby served on a commission charged with revising the state constitution, and in 1965 he was elected to the Kentucky Senate, where he provided leadership in drafting the state budget. Following this, he retired from politics and served as a consultant for Brighton Engineering. Wetherby died on March 27, 1994, of complications from a broken hip and was buried in Frankfort Cemetery in Frankfort, Kentucky.

Early life and career
Lawrence Wetherby was born January 2, 1908, in Middletown, Kentucky. He was the fourth child of Samuel Davis and Fanny (Yenowine) Wetherby. His grandfather was a surgeon in the Union Army during the Civil War. His father was also a physician and farmer, and during his childhood years, Wetherby worked on the family farm.

After graduating from Anchorage High School, Wetherby enrolled in the pre-law program at the University of Louisville. He was a letterman on the football team in 1927 and 1928; he also played second base on the baseball team in 1928 and 1929, and was a letterman in that sport in 1929. He was later inducted into the university's Athletic Hall of Fame. In 1929, he earned his Bachelor of Laws degree and went to work for Judge Henry Tilford. The two would remain partners until 1950. On April 24, 1930, he married Helen Dwyer; the couple had three children.

Thanks to his father's influence, Wetherby became interested in local politics at an early age. School board races fascinated him, and he allied himself with a faction of the Jefferson County Democratic Party headed by Leland Taylor and Ben Ewing. When Ewing was elected county judge in 1933, he appointed Wetherby as a part-time attorney for the Jefferson County juvenile court. He held this position through 1937, then returned to it in 1942 and 1943. In March 1943, he was appointed the first trial commissioner of the juvenile court.

Lieutenant governor
Wetherby was elected chairman of the 34th Legislative District Democratic Committee in 1943 and held the position through 1956. In March 1947, he resigned as trial commissioner of the juvenile court in order to run for lieutenant governor. The strongest of his four opponents in the Democratic primary was Bill May, the nephew of U.S. Representative Andrew J. May. May had sought the support of gubernatorial candidate Earle C. Clements, but Clements refused, possibly because Congressman May was an ally of Clements' political opponent John Y. Brown. Wetherby was also unable to secure Clements' public endorsement, but he won the primary and went on to defeat Republican Orville M. Howard by over 95,000 votes.

Despite Clements' refusal to endorse Wetherby in the primary, the two generally agreed on their legislative agendas and worked well together. Some observers called Wetherby Kentucky's first "working" lieutenant governor. Previous lieutenant governors did little beyond their constitutionally mandated duty of presiding over the Kentucky Senate, but during Clements' administration, Wetherby was charged with preparing a state budget, presiding over the Legislative Research Commission, leading tours for the state Chamber of Commerce, and attending the Southern Governors Conference. Clements also made Wetherby executive secretary of the State Democratic Central Committee, which allowed Wetherby to make many important political contacts.

Governor of Kentucky
On November 27, 1950, Clements resigned to accept a seat in the U.S. Senate, elevating Wetherby to governor. One of his first actions was to call a special legislative session to convene on March 6, 1951 for the purpose of allocating the state's $10 million budget surplus. Among the expenditures approved in the special session were increases in teachers' salaries and state benefits for the needy and government employees. Wetherby's popularity soared as a result of this session, and he seriously considered running for the Senate seat vacated by the death of Virgil Chapman in 1951. Instead, after talking with Clements and other Democratic leaders, he decided to seek a full, four-year term as governor.

Election of 1951
Among the potential candidates for the Democratic gubernatorial nomination in 1951 was former governor A. B. "Happy" Chandler, who was about to be released as baseball commissioner. Chandler and Clements were bitter political enemies, and the possibility of a Chandler candidacy provided the Clements faction of the Democratic party with the impetus to unite behind Wetherby to prevent Chandler from gaining the nomination. Ultimately, Chandler did not seek the nomination and, despite implying that Clements controlled Wetherby, Chandler endorsed Wetherby on May 15, 1951. Wetherby had little trouble defeating Howell Vincent and Jesse Cecil in the Democratic gubernatorial primary, polling the largest majority ever in a Kentucky primary race.

In the general election, Wetherby faced Republican Court of Appeals judge Eugene Siler. Siler was a fundamentalist Christian who claimed that the state government was full of corruption, and only he could stop it. Citing the gambling in Northern Kentucky, bribery accusations against members of Clements' and Wetherby's administrations, and a 1951 scandal involving the University of Kentucky men's basketball team, he referred to Frankfort as "our Nineveh on the Kentucky River". Wetherby countered Siler's accusations of corruption by removing one of the officials accused of bribery from office. He deployed the newly organized Kentucky State Police to counter organized crime in Campbell and Henderson counties. To further discourage crime, he supported legislation to revoke the alcohol licenses of establishments that allowed gambling. Siler's pro-temperance and anti-Catholic views played well in the state's rural areas, but cost him the vote of the growing urban population. Wetherby won the election by a vote of 346,345 to 288,014.

Administration
Early in Wetherby's term, the state's revenues were inflated by the Korean War. Having adopted a pay-as-you-go program for the state, he was forced to raise additional revenue after the war ended. He did so by imposing sin taxes on cigarettes, alcoholic beverages, and parimutuel betting, but he was unable to convince the General Assembly to adopt a sales tax.

Because three members of Wetherby's close family had been killed in automobile accidents on the state's roadways, improving roads was a high priority for Wetherby. The most important of these was the state's first toll road—the Kentucky Turnpike—connecting Louisville and Elizabethtown. He encouraged President Dwight D. Eisenhower to construct a federal toll road connecting the Great Lakes and the Gulf of Mexico. Other political leaders joined him, convincing Eisenhower to construct the long-talked-about Interstate Highway System. Improved roads brought increased tourism, which Wetherby supported by increasing funding to the state park system and adding Breaks Interstate Park, a new park owned jointly by Kentucky and Virginia. Wetherby also brought national attention to Kentucky as prime hunting and fishing land by conducting his own personal sporting excursions in the state.

Wetherby tried to diversify the industries located in Kentucky to balance the state's primarily agrarian economy. He expanded the Agricultural and Industrial Development Board and charged it with conducting land surveys to identify potential industrial sites. He encouraged the development of modern airports in the state and supported the canalization of the Big Sandy River and improvement of the locks and dams on the Kentucky River. He continued to personally lead tours given by the state's Chamber of Commerce. Among the industries that came to the state during his administration were the General Electric Appliance Park in Louisville and the Paducah Gaseous Diffusion Plant in Paducah. In 1954, he used the state police to quash labor unrest in Central City and other parts of the Western Coal Fields. He was not a pawn of industry, however: he secured passage of the state's first laws regulating strip mining and killed a right-to-work bill in 1954.

Neither did Wetherby ignore the needs of agriculture. Under his Green Pastures Program, measures were enacted to diversify crop production, improve beef production, and encourage soil conservation. He secured federal flood control programs for the watersheds of the Salt, Licking, Green, and Kentucky Rivers, saving valuable farmland. In 1952, Wetherby organized an agricultural council to consolidate the work of the state's agricultural bureaucracy. He oversaw completion of the state fairgrounds in Louisville, a project begun under Clements, to better display the state's agricultural products.

Improvements in education were a hallmark of Wetherby's term as governor. Over the course of his administration, he increased funding to education by $20 million. He called for the creation of an educational television network and initiated the state's first publicly funded bookmobile program. He supported the 1954 Minimum Foundation Program, an amendment to the state constitution that allowed funding to be allocated to school districts based upon need rather than number of pupils.

In 1954 and 1955 Wetherby served as chairman of the Southern Governors Conference and urged the southern governors to peacefully implement desegregation as required by the Supreme Court's decision in Brown v. Board of Education. He was one of five southern governors that refused to sign a statement opposing integration. In Kentucky, he appointed an advisory council of both white and black citizens to oversee public school integration, which was accomplished with little acrimony compared to other states. Desegregation was one issue where Wetherby and his lieutenant governor, Emerson "Doc" Beauchamp, disagreed, but because Beauchamp believed he would succeed Wetherby as governor, he did not openly oppose Wetherby's actions.

Among Wetherby's other accomplishments were the creation of a Department of Mental Health and the construction of fifteen hospitals and thirty health centers throughout the state. In 1952, he created the Youth Authority as a central point for the administration of services to delinquent children. He constructed new state prisons, modernized the probation and parole systems, and established a more orderly system of selecting grand and petit juries. He also oversaw some voting reform measures, including the provision of funds to purchase voting machines in areas where they were desired. He was not as successful in the area of government reform. He failed in his efforts to amend the state's constitution to allow the governor to succeed himself in office. He was also unable to win support for a plan to consolidate some of Kentucky's counties. In 1955, the state's voters approved a constitutional amendment granting suffrage to eighteen-year-olds over Wetherby's objections.

Later life
Both Clements and Wetherby endorsed Bert Combs to succeed Wetherby as governor. Wetherby had named Combs to the Kentucky Court of Appeals in 1951 to fill a vacancy created by the death of Judge Roy Helm. Happy Chandler, Clements' old foe, ran against Combs in the primary and painted him as a pawn of "Clementine" and "Wetherbine", his derogatory nicknames for Clements and Wetherby. In fact, Chandler ran the entire campaign not just against Combs, but against Clements and Wetherby as well. He charged both Clements and Wetherby with extravagant spending in their administrations. Among his allegations were that Clements had purchased a $20,000 rug for his office and that Wetherby had paneled his office with African mahogany. Chandler promised that, if elected, he would use "good, honest Kentucky wood" in his office and that all Kentuckians would be invited to the capitol to walk on the $20,000 rug. Ultimately, invoices showed that no $20,000 rug had been purchased by Clements, and Wetherby's paneling had been purchased from and installed by a local contractor. Chandler's charges may have been inaccurate, but he defeated Combs in the primary and went on to win the general election.

Following his term as governor, Wetherby resumed his private law practice. In 1956, Senator Alben Barkley unexpectedly died of a heart attack. The timing of his death meant that the state would elect two senators in 1956—Clements' term was expiring and now Barkley's seat was vacant. President Eisenhower convinced former senator and ambassador John Sherman Cooper to be the Republican candidate for the seat, hoping Cooper's immense popularity in the state would help his own re-election bid. Barkley's death occurred so late in the year that there was not time for a Democratic primary to choose the party's candidate for the open seat. The Democratic state committee chose Wetherby, who was only six months removed from his term as governor.

Neither Wetherby nor Clements enjoyed the support of Governor Chandler. Coupled with this, Senate Majority Leader Lyndon B. Johnson suffered a heart attack during the campaign, and as majority whip, Clements assumed the role of acting majority leader. This took him away from the campaign trail for extended periods of time. During the infrequent visits he was able to make to the state, he campaigned for his former lieutenant governor, Wetherby. In the general election, Cooper defeated Wetherby by 65,000 votes and Clements lost to Thruston Ballard Morton by about 7,000 votes. It was the first time Clements had lost a race in thirty years, and Kentucky Democrats would not elect a senator again for another sixteen years.

After this defeat, Wetherby moved to Franklin County and secured a position at Brighton Engineering with help from his old primary opponent, Bill May. From 1964 to 1966, he was a delegate to an assembly charged with revising the state constitution. In 1965, May backed Wetherby in his campaign for the Kentucky Senate. He won the election, defeating the candidate favored by Chandler, and was chosen president of that body from 1966 to 1968. He was so effective in this position that the state's 1966 budget was debated for only ten days before passing by a vote of 31–5 in virtually the same form as it was presented.

After his service in the state senate, Wetherby returned to Brighton Engineering, where he eventually became a vice-president. Wetherby died on March 27, 1994 of complications from a broken hip. He is buried at the Frankfort Cemetery. The administration building at Western Kentucky University and a gymnasium at Morehead State University were named in his honor.

References

Bibliography

Further reading
 

1908 births
1994 deaths
Burials at Frankfort Cemetery
Democratic Party governors of Kentucky
Lieutenant Governors of Kentucky
Louisville Cardinals football players
Kentucky lawyers
Democratic Party Kentucky state senators
Politicians from Louisville, Kentucky
University of Louisville alumni
20th-century American lawyers
20th-century American politicians
Southern Methodists
American United Methodists
Players of American football from Louisville, Kentucky
Baseball players from Louisville, Kentucky
Louisville Cardinals baseball players
20th-century Methodists